John Bonham-Carter  (22 September 1788 – 17 February 1838) was a British politician and barrister.

Early life
John was born on 22 September 1788 into the "Whig oligarchy which dominated the corporation of Portsmouth."  He was the son of Dorothy Cuthbert Carter and Sir John Carter (1741–1808), who served as Mayor of Portsmouth. His paternal grandfather was the merchant John Carter and his maternal grandfather was George Cuthbert of Portsmouth.

He was educated at Miss Whishaw and Mr. Forester's schools in Portsmouth followed by the Unitarian Academy in Cheshunt, Hertfordshire in 1800, then at Higham Hill in Walthamstow, Essex in 1801. He graduated from Trinity College, Cambridge in 1806.

In 1827, he changed his name to Bonham-Carter to inherit the estate of his cousin Thomas Bonham.

Career
Bonham-Carter was a Justice of Peace and Deputy Lieutenant. He was High Sheriff of Hampshire in 1829 and Whig Member of Parliament (MP) for Portsmouth from 1816 to 1838.

Personal life
On 25 December 1816, he married Joanna Maria Smith (1792–1884), daughter of abolitionist William Smith. Joanna's sister Frances was the mother of Florence Nightingale, and her brother Benjamin was the father of Barbara Bodichon and Benjamin Leigh Smith. Together, John and Joanna were the parents of several children, including:

 John Bonham-Carter (1817–1884), who married Mary Baring, daughter of Francis Baring, 1st Baron Northbrook.
 Joanna Hilary Bonham Carter (1821–1865), who was an artist and friend of political journalist Harriet Martineau. Her portraits are held in the National Portrait Gallery.
 Alfred Bonham Carter (1825–1910), who married Mary Henrietta Norman.
 Henry Bonham Carter (1827–1921), married Sibella Charlotte Norman
 Alice Bonham Carter (1828–1912)
 Hugh Bonham Carter (1832–1896), married Jane Margaret McDonald (d. 1911)
 Elinor Mary Bonham Carter (1837–1923), who married jurist Albert Venn Dicey, brother of author Edward Dicey and cousin of Sir Leslie Stephen (father of Virginia Woolf and Vanessa Bell) and Judge James Fitzjames Stephen.

Bonham-Carter died on 17 February 1838.

Descendants
Through his son Henry, he was the grandfather of Sir Maurice Bonham-Carter, the Principal Private Secretary to H. H. Asquith, his father-in-law, during his time as Prime Minister. Maurice was married to life peer Violet, Baroness Asquith of Yarnbury.

See also
 Bonham Carter family

References

External links 
 
 

1788 births
1838 deaths
Deputy Lieutenants of Hampshire
High Sheriffs of Hampshire
Members of the Parliament of the United Kingdom for English constituencies
UK MPs 1812–1818
UK MPs 1818–1820
UK MPs 1820–1826
UK MPs 1826–1830
UK MPs 1830–1831
UK MPs 1831–1832
UK MPs 1832–1835
UK MPs 1835–1837
UK MPs 1837–1841
John
Committee members of the Society for the Diffusion of Useful Knowledge